Talat Bulut (born 23 March 1956) is a Turkish actor. He has appeared in more than twenty films since 1980.

Selected filmography

References

External links 

1956 births
Living people
Turkish male film actors